Nina Karin Elise Inhammar Allard (born Inhammar 22 May 1977 in Lidköping (grew also up in Svalöv and Klippan)) is a former Swedish singer. She studied music at secondary school and sang in a jazz band, and she also appeared in Hässleholmsrevyn.

Inhammar and Kim Kärnfalk were famous when they appeared in the reality show Friends på turné in 1999. Their band Friends won Melodifestivalen 2001 with the song Lyssna till ditt hjärta. When Friends split in 2002, Kärnfalk and Inhammar continued alone in their duo Nina & Kim (split in 2006).

Inhammar left the music career in 2006.

References and sources

People from Lidköping Municipality
1977 births
Living people
21st-century Swedish singers
21st-century Swedish women singers
Melodifestivalen contestants of 2004
Melodifestivalen contestants of 2002
Melodifestivalen contestants of 2001
Melodifestivalen contestants of 2000